Croatian Uruguayans comprise Croat migrants to Uruguay and their descendants.

The first Croats reached the Río de la Plata region during the second half of the 18th century; the biggest inflow of immigrants was mostly during the first half of the 20th century. They established their own institutions, such as the Croatian Home.

According to UN estimates there are some 3,300 people of Croat descent living in Uruguay. Other estimates place the figure at around 5,000.

In 2006 Eduardo R. Antonich published the monograph "Croatia and Croats in Uruguay".

Notable people

Past
Antonio Lussich (1848-1928), sailor, writer and naturalist
Arturo Lussich (1872-1966), physician and politician
Raúl Sendic (1926-1989), politician and guerrilla leader
Present
Jorge Jukich (born 1943), Olympic cyclist 
Raúl Fernando Sendic (born 1962), politician, Vice President of the Republic 2015-2017

See also
 Croats
 List of Croats

References

External links
 

Uruguay
European Uruguayan
 
Ethnic groups in Uruguay
Immigration to Uruguay
Croatia–Uruguay relations